Nuits Rouges is a 1974 French-Italian crime and thriller film directed by Georges Franju. The film was released in the U.S. in an English-dubbed version by New Line Cinema under the title Shadowman in 1975.

Cast
 Gayle Hunnicutt as La femme
 Jacques Champreux as L'homme sans visage
 Josephine Chaplin as Martine Leduc
 Ugo Pagliai as Paul de Borrego
 Gert Froebe as Le commissaire Sorbier

Production
Nuits Rouges was filmed in 1973. The film is a 100-minute theatrical version of a film originally commissioned for television. The budget for the film was so modest that Franju had to film all interiors of the film on a studio set.

Release
Nuits Rouges was released on November 20, 1974, in France.

Reception
Nuits Rouges received mixed and even mocking reviews from French critics on its release. Nuits Rouges was released on DVD in the United Kingdom as part of Eureka's Masters of Cinema series along with another film by Georges Franju, Judex (1963) in 2008.

Notes

References

External links 
 

1974 films
Films directed by Georges Franju
French crime thriller films
Italian crime thriller films
1970s French-language films
1970s crime thriller films
1970s French films
1970s Italian films